The Tax Credits Act 2002 chapter 21 was a Public and General British Act of Parliament passed by the Labour Government at the time, led by Prime Minister Tony Blair. The Act established the administrative framework for the implementation of tax credits and sets out who is entitled to tax credits.

The Labour Party continued to make radical changes to employment and welfare laws; in order to facilitate additional top-ups to the low paid. Thresholds were set down by law but changed by revision upwards on an annual basis. Annual changes were also made to the National Minimum Wage. The aim of the act was to reduce poverty, condemn bad employers for poverty pay, and raise standards.

In 2015, the newly elected Conservative majority government determined that Tax Credit abolition would save £4.5 billion from annual expenditure. The plan proposal involved lowering the threshold and increasing the taper rate, in order to take the low paid out of taxation altogether. The Exchequer argued that tax credits were robbing taxpayers by subsidising low pay by employers; effectively repaying the poor from taxed wages.

The House of Lords, that no longer had an in-built Conservative majority reported that they would consider rejecting the bill of repeal. Government ministers reminded their Lordships that there were precious few precedents for the revocation of a Statutory Instrument of this kind. The Lords has no constitutional authority over financial bills in Parliament. John McDonnell, Shadow Chancellor of the Exchequer argued for bi-partisanship to save what he described as driving 200,000 children into poverty depriving the poorest families on average of £1,300 per annum. Former Chancellor Ken Clarke argued that tax credits subsidised employers to pay low wages. Government policy mantra was "a low tax, high pay, high growth economy."

References

External links 
 https://www.telegraph.co.uk/news/politics/georgeosborne/11953344/Cabinet-in-crisis-as-ministers-turn-on-George-Osborne-and-his-tax-credit-letter-timed-to-ruin-Christmas.html

United Kingdom Acts of Parliament 2002